Elaine Bourbeau (born 24 October 1949) is a Canadian rower. She competed in the women's quadruple sculls event at the 1976 Summer Olympics.

References

1949 births
Living people
Canadian female rowers
Olympic rowers of Canada
Rowers at the 1976 Summer Olympics
Sportspeople from Quebec